Abdullah Eksioglu (born March 30, 1970) is a Turkish film director, screenwriter and film producer.

Early career
Eksioglu graduated from the Anadolu University Faculty of Economics. He began his career as a journalist during high school in 1986.  He worked in various positions in many national daily newspapers and magazines.

Radio and film career
He was among the founders of Genç Radyo in 1992.  In 1993 he established the news agency Agency Europe & Anatolia together with Elvin Eksioglu. He founded Eksantrik Produksiyon in 1998 again together with Elvin Eksioglu.  In 2000, he worked as the Secretariat General of Press Council of Turkey for a period of a year.

After 2000, Abdullah Eksioglu was more interested in the movie industry, after various positions in commercials film productions on more than 250 films, he started directing commercials himself. Abdullah Eksioglu currently full filling his duties as a director of commercial films under Eksantrik Produksiyon and also serves as the Chief Editor in Agency Europe & Anatolia news agency.

Filmography
 2011: FM 1992 (Documentary)
 2011: Suya Yazilan Tarih (Documentary)

References

 MedyaTava
 ElektronikGazete
 TelevizyonDizisi
 Gazetea24
 Gazeteciler
 Hurriyet Newspaper
 SinemaMuzik
 Gazete
 HaberimPort

External links 

 
 

Living people
1970 births
Turkish film directors
Anadolu University alumni